Oakdale Hospital was a community hospital in Oakdale, Caerphilly, Wales. It was managed by the Aneurin Bevan University Health Board.

History
The hospital, which formed part of the Oakdale Garden Village built for the workers of the Tredegar Iron and Coal Company, was opened in 1915. It provided 14 beds primarily for patients waiting to be discharged home. After services transferred to the new Ysbyty Ystrad Fawr at Ystrad Mynach, Oakdale Hospital closed in 2011. It is now a private house known as "Ty Webb".

References

Hospital buildings completed in 1915
Hospitals in Caerphilly County Borough
Hospitals established in 1915
Defunct hospitals in Wales
1915 establishments in Wales
Hospitals disestablished in 2011
2011 disestablishments in Wales